The Suckling (also known as Sewage Baby) is a 1990 American horror film directed by Francis Teri and starring Frank Rivera (under the pseudonym Frank Reeves), Marie Michaels, and Michael Gingold.

Plot
At a back-alley abortion clinic/brothel, a reluctant woman's aborted fetus is flushed down a toilet into the sewer system where it comes into contact with toxic waste. It transforms into a giant mutated monster and goes on a killing spree in the clinic.

Cast
 Frank Rivera as Axel
 Marie Michaels as Candy
 Gerald Preger as Sherman
 Lisa Petruno as Girl
 Janet Sovey as Big Mama
 Tim Martin Crouse as Bill
 Susan Brodsky as Sheryl
 Allen Lieb as Doctor
 Bobby Shapiro	as Doctor
 Caesar Monroy as Attendant
 Antoinette Greene as Bertha
 Brian Muirhill as Customer
 Jeff Burchfield as Policeman
 Hector Collazo as Creature
 Michael Gingold as The Suckling
 Ella Aralovich as Mary
 Alley Ninestein as Nurse

Reception
John Squires of Bloody Disgusting referred to the film as an example of a "best worst movie", and wrote that it is "home to all the terrible acting and weird storytelling choices that make bad movies so much fun to watch. This movie has it all, and it’s highlighted by surprisingly good creature effects that outshine absolutely everything else on display in it." Matt Hudson of HorrorNews.net gave the film a negative review, criticizing the film's low budget, acting, and script.

Home media
The Suckling was released for on DVD by Elite on May 10, 2005. It was later released by Films Around World on August 28, 2018. The film was first released on Blu-ray on March 26, 2019, by Vinegar Syndrome.

References

External links
 
 
 

1990 films
1990s monster movies
1990 horror films
American monster movies
American films about revenge
Giant monster films
Films about abortion
American science fiction horror films
1990s science fiction horror films
American splatter films
1990s English-language films
1980s English-language films
1990s American films